Scaligero Castle or Castello Scaligero may refer to:

Scaligero Castle (Sirmione), near Sirmione, Lombardy, Italy
Castello Scaligero (Malcesine), Malcesine, Verona, Italy